Iuliu Hajnal (born 30 August 1951) is a Romanian former international footballer who played as a midfielder.

International career
He earned 12 international caps for Romania scoring 3 goals, making his debut under coach Angelo Niculescu when he came as a substitute and replaced Flavius Domide in the 75th minute of a friendly which ended 3–3 against Italy in which he scored the final goal of the game. His following two goals were in two friendlies, a 4–1 victory against Japan and a 2–2 against the Soviet Union. Hajnal also played two games at the 1973–76 Balkan Cup, one at the 1977–80 Balkan Cup and in a 1–1 against Scotland at the Euro 1976 qualifiers. His last game for the national team was a friendly against Argentina which ended with a 2–0 loss.

Honours

Player
ASA Târgu Mureş
Divizia A runner-up: 1974–75
Divizia B: 1970–71

Notes

References

1951 births
Living people
Romanian footballers
Romania under-21 international footballers
Olympic footballers of Romania
Romania international footballers
Association football midfielders
ASA Târgu Mureș (1962) players
Liga I players
Liga II players
Romanian football managers
People from Bihor County